Karfunkel is a surname. Notable people with the surname include: 

Aaron Karfunkel (died 1816), Bohemian rabbi 
George Karfunkel (born 1948/49), American businessman

See also
Garfunkel